West Campus may refer to:

 Duke University West Campus, part of Duke University's campus in Durham, North Carolina
 Boston University West Campus, the westernmost part of Boston University's Charles River campus in Boston, Massachusetts
 Arizona State University at the West campus, one of four university campuses that compose Arizona State University
 Cornell West Campus, a residential section of Cornell University's Ithaca, New York campus
 University of Northern Colorado West Campus, a residential section of the University of Northern Colorado
 West Campus, Austin, Texas, United States
 West Campus High School, a public college preparatory magnet high school located in Sacramento, California

See also
 Center West Campus